José Meneses (11 January 1924 – 24 April 2013) was a Mexican basketball player. He competed in the men's tournament at the 1952 Summer Olympics.

References

1924 births
2013 deaths
Mexican men's basketball players
Olympic basketball players of Mexico
Basketball players at the 1952 Summer Olympics
Basketball players from Chihuahua